The Guilford Quartz Monzonite is a Silurian or Ordovician quartz monzonite pluton in Howard County, Maryland. It is described as a biotite-muscovite-quartz monzonite which occurs as discontinuous lenticular bodies which intrude mainly through the Wissahickon Formation (gneiss).

The extent of this intrusion was originally mapped in 1940 as the "Guilford granite".  It was given its current name in 1964 by C. A. Hopson.  Hopson grouped the Guilford Quartz Monzonite with the Ellicott City Granodiorite and the Woodstock Quartz Monzonite as "Late-kinematic intrusive masses."

Description
The Guilford Quartz Monzonite was described in 1898 as "perhaps the most attractive stone in the state" by Edward B. Mathews of the Maryland Geological Survey.  He provides this detailed description of the granite:

Hopson reported the chemical composition (by %) of the Guilford Quartz Diorite from 1.5 miles west-southwest of Guilford along the Middle Patuxent River, as follows:

Early quarrying
The 1898 account of Edward B. Mathews of the Maryland Geological Survey of the quarry at Guilford (now within the town of Columbia) is as follows:

Age
A. A. Drake argued that the Guilford is of Ordovician age because it is probably comagmatic with the Woodstock Quartz Monzonite dated at 444 Ma. An earlier source gives the date of 420 +/-50 Ma. More recently, radiometric dating (U-Pb-TIMS) of zircon crystals extracted from the Guilford Quartz Monzonite yielded an age of 362 +/- 3 Ma (Devonian).

References

Howard County, Maryland
Columbia, Maryland
Granitic rocks
Igneous petrology of Maryland
Silurian magmatism
Ordovician magmatism